HD 47500, also known as HR 2446, is a binary star in the southern constellation Columba. The primary has an apparent magnitude of 5.91, making it faintly visible to the naked eye if viewed under ideal conditions. As for the companion, its visual magnitude is 7.51.

The binary nature of this system was first discovered by Richard Alfred Rossiter in 1942. Their current separation is half of an arcsecond, making it difficult to measure the components properties. Nevertheless, the secondary component is located along a position angle of 4° as of 1999.

HD 47500 has a stellar classification of B6 IV-V, a B-type star with a luminosity class intermediate between a subgiant and main sequence star. Hube (1970) gave the primary a slightly cooler class of B7 III, indicating that it is already a giant star, while Houk (1982) gave it a class of B5/7 IV, intermediate between a B5 and B7 subgiant. Nevertheless, it is estimated to be 34 million years old, having completed 98.5% of its main sequence lifetime.

References

B-type subgiants
Binary stars
047500
31637
2446
Columbae, 112
Columba (constellation)
CD-36 03031
B-type main-sequence stars